Andamia reyi, the suckerlip blenny, is a species of combtooth blenny found in coral reefs in the Pacific and Indian Oceans. This species reaches a length of  TL. The specific name honours the collector of the type, the French doctor Paul Rey.

References

reyi
Fish described in 1880